Scopula dubernardi is a moth of the  family Geometridae. It is found in China.

References

Moths described in 1923
dubernardi
Moths of Asia